Willard, Wisconsin may refer to:
Willard, Clark County, Wisconsin, an unincorporated community in Clark County
Willard, Rusk County, Wisconsin, a town in Rusk County